Földi or Foldi is a Hungarian surname. Notable people with the surname include:

 Andrew Földi (1926–2007), Hungarian-American singer
 Ernő Földi, Hungarian table tennis player
 Imre Földi (born 1938), Hungarian weightlifter
 László Földi (1919–2001), Hungarian physicist
 László Földi (politician) (born 1952), Hungarian politician

See also 

Foldy–Wouthuysen transformation, in physics, a unitary transformation
Földes, Hungarian town

Hungarian-language surnames